Horsham railway station serves the town of Horsham in West Sussex, England. These trains usually divide here with the front (Southampton/Portsmouth) portion travelling fast (next stop ) and the rear (Bognor Regis) half providing stopping services.

A new Thameslink service (TL5) entered service in March 2018, running from Horsham to Peterborough (via Redhill).  This now connects London Bridge, Farringdon and Kings Cross St Pancras in central London, through north London, to Huntingdon and Peterborough.

History 
Horsham would have been an important midway point in two of the original proposals for a London to Brighton railway via the Adur valley but in the event Sir John Rennie's proposed direct line through Three Bridges (in east Crawley) and Haywards Heath was given parliamentary approval. As a result, the original Horsham station was the terminus of a single track branch line from Three Bridges opened by the London Brighton and South Coast Railway (LBSCR) in February 1848.

Between 1859 and 1867, the station was enlarged on several occasions to coincide with the doubling of the branch line from Three Bridges; the extension of the railway from Horsham along the Arun Valley Line; the opening of new lines from Horsham to  Shoreham via Steyning and from Christ's Hospital to Guildford. Finally, in 1867, a new route to Dorking, Leatherhead and thence to London, was opened. The station was again partially rebuilt and resignalled, with three signal boxes, in 1875.

The present station was built by the Southern Railway in the International Modern Style in 1938 to coincide with the electrification of the line. The building was designed by James Robb Scott and is grade II listed, see external links below. The lines to Guildford and Shoreham both fell victim to the Beeching Axe in the mid-1960s, the former being closed to passengers on 14 June 1965 and the latter on 7 March 1966.

In September 2011, the station frontage was closed to undergo extensive refurbishment work to the main ticket hall. It reopened late in 2012 with a new side entrance, internal lift access, relocated barriers and stairway, a new ticket office, and new information screens. The platforms received a rebuild of the roofing and refurbished waiting rooms. Previously, the building was shared with Henfield Hire, who vacated in order to give the floor space needed to create the new features and new ceiling and lights and so completing a complete reconfiguration of the layout.

Accidents and incidents 
On 9 January 1972, an engineers train overran signals and was in a rear-end collision with an electric multiple unit at the station. Fifteen people were injured.

Services 
Services at Horsham are operated by Southern and Thameslink using  and  EMUs.

The typical off-peak service in trains per hour is:
 2 tph to  via 
 1 tph to London Victoria via  and 
 2 tph to  via Gatwick Airport,  and 
 1 tph to Portsmouth & Southsea (non-stop to )

On Sundays, the service to London Victoria via Epsom does not run. In addition, the service to Peterborough is reduced to 1 tph and only runs as far as London Bridge. Mainline services are reduced to 1 tph with no service to Southampton and trains dividing at Barnham instead of Horsham.

Motive power depot 
A small wooden motive power depot was built at the station in 1876. This was replaced by a brick-built ten-road semi-roundhouse together with a 46 ft (14 metre) turntable in 1880. This in turn was extended with a further eight-roads in 1900. In 1927 the Southern Railway installed a 55 ft (16.8 metre) turntable. This depot was closed in 1964.

Signalbox 
Nearby is the type 13 signal box dating from 1938, which is also Grade II listed. It closed in 2005 when its controls were transferred to Three Bridges Integrated Electronic Control Centre.

New Services 

New services from Horsham have been introduced to destinations north of central London from December 2018. The new timetable was originally proposed in May 2014, with services between Horsham and  extended to Peterborough via St Pancras International, Stevenage and St Neots.

References

External links 

Route Map and Timetable for Sutton & Mole Valley Line
Route Map and Timetable for Arun Valley Lines
Photos of the station and signal box together with English Heritage listing description
Feature about the history of the station and signal box since 1834

Horsham
Railway stations in West Sussex
DfT Category C2 stations
Former London, Brighton and South Coast Railway stations
Railway stations in Great Britain opened in 1848
Railway stations served by Govia Thameslink Railway
Grade II listed railway stations
Art Deco architecture in England
James Robb Scott buildings